Joseph Adamy (born 15 January 1778 in Oberwesel; died 24 February 1849 in Hadamar) was a Nassauian mine owner and politician. From 1828 to 1832, Adamy was a member of the Second Chamber of the Estates of the Duchy of Nassau.

Political career
After the death of Jacob Preuss in December 1826, Adamy was elected as a representative of the group of landowners in the electoral district of Dillenburg in the Second Chamber of the Estates of the Duchy of Nassau. Adamy served in the Second Chamber for four years. In 1832, Adamy relinquished his mandate when he was one of the 15 deputies who boycotted the protest against the Pairsschub of 1831 as part of the 1832 Nassau Domain Dispute. The Pairsschub was an instrument used by William, Duke of Nassau to increase membership in the First Chamber of the Estates to benefit his government by weakening the Second Chamber.

In 1849, Adamy was a member of the "Society for the Implementation of the Constitution and Respect for People's Rights".

Family
Joseph Adamy was the son of surgeon (Franz) Joseph Adamy (born 1744/45, died 6 March 1784 in Oberwesel) and his wife Catharina née Herbrand (wedding on 25 November 1772). Joseph Adamy married on 6 September 1801 in Hadamar his first wife, Christina, née Scheibel (11 June 1765 – 12 February 1818). After Christina's death, he married on 24 March 1819 in Mainz, in a second marriage his wife Therese née Leyden (8 August 1877).

Religion
Joseph Adamy was a Roman Catholic.

Literature 
 Cornelia Rösner: Nassauische Parliamentarier: Nassauische Parliamentarier. Teil 1. Der Landtag des Herzogtums Nassau 1818 – 1866, Wiesbaden 1997, Seite 3

1778 births
1849 deaths
German Roman Catholics
People from Oberwesel
People from the Duchy of Nassau
Members of the Second Chamber of the Estates of the Duchy of Nassau